The Old Wallop is a 1927 Our Gang short silent comedy film directed by Robert F. McGowan. It was the 65th Our Gang short that was released and was considered to be a lost film. However, a near-complete foreign print was discovered in Munich, Bavaria, in the 1970s: the United States version was destroyed in the 1965 MGM vault fire.

Cast

The Gang
 Joe Cobb as Joe
 Jackie Condon as Jackie
 Jean Darling as Jean
 Allen Hoskins as Farina
 Bobby Hutchins as Wheezer
 Jay R. Smith as Jay
 Harry Spear as Harry
 Pete the Pup as himself

Additional cast
 Anita Garvin as Mother
 Charles A. Bachman as Cop
 Edgar Dearing as Police captain

See also
 Our Gang filmography

References

External links

1927 films
1927 comedy films
1927 short films
1920s rediscovered films
American silent short films
American black-and-white films
Films directed by Robert F. McGowan
Metro-Goldwyn-Mayer short films
Our Gang films
Rediscovered American films
1920s American films
Silent American comedy films
1920s English-language films